Napoleon Papageorgiou (2 May 1908 – 1991) was a Greek athlete. He competed in the men's javelin throw at the 1936 Summer Olympics.

References

External links
 

1908 births
1991 deaths
Athletes (track and field) at the 1936 Summer Olympics
Greek male javelin throwers
Olympic athletes of Greece
Athletes from Tripoli, Greece